Horsley Cross is a hamlet in the English county of Essex.

Horsley Cross lies on the B1035 road just to the north of the main A120 that connects London and Harwich and to the south of Horsleycross Street.

The population of the hamlet is included in the civil parish of Mistley.

External links 
 

Hamlets in Essex
Tendring